Costa Granadina is a comarca in southern Spain, corresponding to the Mediterranean coastline of the province of Granada.  It is also but less frequently called the Costa Tropical or Costa de Granada.  It is crossed by the N-340 coastal highway that runs southwest–northeast along Spain's Mediterranean coast, to the border with France. Within the last 4 years the A7 motorway has been extended along the coast from Nerja in the Málaga province to Motril where it links the A7 motorway to the A44 motorway which heads north from Motril to the city of Granada.

Geography
The Costa Granadina is made up mostly of agricultural zones and small resort towns and villages. What makes the Costa Granadina unique in comparison to the rest of the Spanish coast is that the mountains of the Sierra Nevada range fall to the very edge of the Mediterranean Sea on the rugged coastline. Except for la vega de Motril, there are no flat areas for large urban sprawl.

Climate

The area east of Málaga is less dry and more lush than the surrounding areas. This is because the Sierra Nevada (Spain) mountain range that serves as a backdrop to the Costa Granadina catches more rain and thus supplies the area with abundant irrigation.
The Costa Granadina, with more than 320 sunny days and more than 3000 sunshine hours a year, has an unusual borderline subtropical microclimate. The Sierra Nevada (Spain) mountain range, protects this coast from the cold north winds due to the Föhn effect that creates a subtropical frost-free microclimate with very mild winter temperatures. The average annual temperature ranges between 18 and 20 degrees: While summers are warm, hovering the maximums between 27 and 31 degrees while winters are very mild, with maximums between 17 and 19 degrees and minimums between 10 - 12 degrees, with the annual rainfall of around 500 mm/year (however, Motril has a warm semi-arid climate (BSh) due to its low annual rainfall 378.9mm).

The climatic conditions of the Costa Granadina supports a cultivation of exotic tropical fruits unique in Europe. This is the case of cherimoya, which has a designation of origin and has made Spain the world's leading producer of this fruit. There are also crops of papayas, avocados, mangoes, guavas, litchi, etc.

Another typical farming on the Costa Granadina is sugar cane that is only grown here in the entire European continent.

Municipalities
The main towns of the Costa Granadina are Motril, Almuñécar and Salobreña. Motril is  principally a manufacturing and agricultural center (horticulture, vegetables, tropical fruits and some sugar cane, although the last is declining). Motril also possesses the main seaport in the Costa Granadina. Almuñécar is primarily a resort town and agricultural center (tropical fruits), with the summer-time vacation population more than tripling the town's population. Like the rest of the Spanish coast, it recently underwent a housing and construction boom with some environmental degradation. This housing boom was not as severe as on other parts of the Spanish coastline due to the townships of Almuñécar and La Herradura being unable to agree the terms of their new Urban plan (PGOU) since 2002.

There are 17 municipalities, running along this coast or inland behind the coast, and listed below from west to east:

Points of interest
The Costa Granadina has many historical sights, including prehistoric cave paintings in nearby Nerja; many Roman ruins including roads, bridges, buildings, fish salting factories, and irrigation systems used to this day; and abundant remains of the many-centuries domination of the region by the Arab conquerors.  In fact, Almuñécar  served as the entry point to Iberia and establishment of a power base for Abd ar-Rahman I in 755, who came from Damascus and was the founder of an independent Muslim dynasty that ruled the greater part of the Iberian Peninsula for nearly three centuries thereafter.

References

External links

Almuñécar - La Herradura - A guide in English for tourists and foreigners living on Costa Tropical(Costa Granada)
Costa Tropical Travel Guide - Travel guide focusing on the Costa Granadina area of Granada
Costa Tropical News - English magazine and news website for the region
Seaside Gazette - English magazine and news website for Costa Tropical, Lecrin Valley and Alpujarras
Relocation information about the Costa Tropical

Comarcas of the Province of Granada
Coasts of Spain